Darko Lazić (born on 13 October 1991) is a Serbian turbo-folk singer. Born in the south Vojvodina village of Brestač, he rose to prominence as the winner of the fourth season of the televised singing contest Zvezde Granda in 2009. His debut album was released the same year under Grand Production.

Between 2014 and 2019, Lazić was married to singer and fellow-Zvezde Granda contestant Ana Sević, with whom he has a daughter. His former fiancé, Marina Gagić, also gave birth to his son.  

Over the years, Lazić has received substantial media coverage for his problematic lifestyle. In October 2018, Lazić had a severe traffic accident, due to driving under influence 100 km per hour and not having his seatbelt on. Although committing several traffic offences, he didn't face any legal consequences. Same year, a video of Lazić consuming cocaine surfaced to the public, which led to him admitting to have suffered from drug addiction.

Discography 
Albums
 Brate moj (2009)
 Godinu dana 300 kafana (2011)
Singles
 Korak do sna (2009)
 Idi drugome  (2009)
 Izaberi nekog da na mene lici (2009)
 Srce od silikona (2009)
 Slatka Mala Vestica (2009)
 Godinu dana 300 kafana (2011)
 Sad sve imas (2011)
 Luda noc (2011)
 Palim klub (ft. MC Yankoo) (2014)
 Najbolje godine (feat Evrokrem barabe) (2016)
 Majko (2019)
 A Nekad Je Dolazila Stalno'' (2020)

See also
Music of Serbia
Turbo-folk

References

External links
 

1991 births
Living people
Serbian turbo-folk singers
People from Pećinci
Grand Production artists